Travis Katz (born 1971) is an American technology entrepreneur and investor.  He is currently the President and CEO of electric vehicle maker BrightDrop.  Katz co-founded Fox Interactive Media, led international expansion for social networking site MySpace, and founded online travel site Trip.com, which was acquired by CTrip in 2017.

Early life and education 
Travis Katz grew up in Englewood, Colorado. Katz attended Stanford University, where he graduated with a degree in Public Policy.  He also attended the Wharton School of Business at the University of Pennsylvania, where he graduated with an MBA in 2001.

Career

World Bank 
Katz started his career at the World Bank, where he led research on urban development as well as rural water supply.  He co-authored a number papers on improving city governance and urban innovation in Latin America and the Caribbean, and co-led a global study on making investments in rural water supply in impoverished countries sustainable as part of the joint World Bank-UNDP water supply program.

Fox Interactive Media 
Katz joined Fox Entertainment Group in 2003.  During this time, Katz was one of "four rising stars" selected by News Corp CEO Rupert Murdoch to look at possible ways to use the web to distribute News Corp’s content to new audiences.  Together with Ross Levinsohn, Adam Bain and Michael Kirby, Katz founded Fox Interactive Media, and was given a "war chest of $2 billion" to acquire digital businesses, including MySpace, Photobucket, Rotten Tomatoes, and IGN. Within a year, Fox Interactive Media had overtaken Yahoo! to be the most visited property on the Internet.

MySpace 
In February 2006, Katz joined social media company MySpace to lead the company's expansion outside of the United States. By January 2007, Katz had launched the MySpace business in 11 countries, and 25% of MySpace's 325,000 new sign ups were coming from outside the US. By 2008, Katz had launched MySpace in 29 countries, and had taken over international operations for other News Corp digital brands, including IGN and Rotten Tomatoes. Katz left MySpace in July 2009.

Trip.com 

In 2010, Katz launched an online travel company, Gogobot, later rebranded Trip.com.  Trip.com used artificial intelligence to provide travelers with real time recommendations based on their interests, location, weather and other signals. The site raised $39M over 3 rounds from Redpoint Ventures, HomeAway, Battery Ventures and Innovation Endeavors. In October 2017, Trip.com was acquired by Chinese travel company Ctrip and became that company's flagship brand outside of China. At the time of the acquisition, Ctrip reported the site had 60 million users. Following the acquisition, Katz worked as vice president of product for Skyscanner, a Ctrip company, where Trip.com's reviews and photos were integrated.

BrightDrop 
In 2020, Katz joined as CEO and President of BrightDrop, an electric vehicle company, backed by General Motors, targeting commercial delivery.

Under Katz's leadership, BrightDrop secured contracts with Walmart and Merchants Fleet, as well as an agreement to develop service vehicles for Verizon. The company delivered its first vehicles, purpose-built for commercial delivery, to FedEx in December 2021.  In November, 2022, Katz announced BrightDrop was on track to deliver $1 billion in revenue in 2023, making it one of the fastest companies in history to achieve this milestone.

Personal life 
Katz lives with his family in Menlo Park, California. He is an active traveler who has visited more than 54 countries.  He met his wife on a camel safari in Jaisalmer, India.

References

1971 births
Living people
American technology company founders
American technology chief executives
Stanford University alumni
Wharton School of the University of Pennsylvania alumni